Orobanche vallicola is a species of broomrape known by the common name hillside broomrape.

It is endemic to California, where it is an uncommon member of the flora in forests and woodlands.

Description
Orobanche vallicola is a parasite growing attached to the roots of other plants, generally Sambucus species. The plant produces a thick, hairy, glandular pinkish stem up to about 40 centimeters tall.

As a parasite taking its nutrients from a host plant, it lacks leaves and chlorophyll.

The inflorescence is a cluster or branching array of flowers. Each tubular flower is up to 3 centimeters long, yellowish to pinkish and red-veined in color.

External links
Jepson Manual Treatment of Orobanche vallicola
USDA Plants Profile for Orobanche vallicola
Orobanche vallicola — Photo gallery

vallicola
Endemic flora of California
Natural history of the California chaparral and woodlands
Natural history of the California Coast Ranges
Natural history of the Central Valley (California)
Natural history of the San Francisco Bay Area
Natural history of the Santa Monica Mountains
Threatened flora of California